Hayne is a surname of English origin.

Etymology

According to the Oxford Dictionary of Family Names in Britain and Ireland, modern names Haine, Hayne, Haines, Hains, Hanes, and Haynes all in four different medieval names, which came to sound the same.

 The Middle English name Hain. This is thought to have originated as a pet form of Anglo-Norman names such as Reynald, Reyner and Rainbert.
 The personal name Hagan, which is itself of diverse origins.
 The Old English word haga ('enclosure', Middle English hay), in the oblique case form hagan (Middle English hayne), whose use could have arisen from a locative epithet such as æt hagan ('at the enclosure').
 Perhaps the Middle English word heyne (and its variants, such as haine, hayn), meaning 'mean wretch, niggard'.

Distribution
Around 2011, there were 533 bearers of the surname Hayne in Great Britain and none in Ireland. In 1881, there were 774 bearers of the name in Great Britain, concentrated in the south-west of England, particularly in Dorset.

People

 Arthur P. Hayne (1788–1867), United States Senator from South Carolina
 Charles Seale-Hayne (1833–1903), British businessman and Liberal politician
 Edward G. Hayne (1874–1945), American businessman and politician
 Friedrich Gottlob Hayne (1763–1832), a botanist
 Gareth Hayne, New Zealand cricketer
 George Hayne, British merchant and entrepreneur
 Isaac Hayne, a South Carolinian executed during the American Revolutionary War
 Jarryd Hayne, an Australian rugby league footballer
 Kenneth Hayne, a Puisne Justice of the High Court of Australia
 Paul Hamilton Hayne, (1830 – 1886) Southern American poet, critic, and editor
 Richard Hayne (1947- ) president and CEO of Urban Outfitters
 Robert Y. Hayne, a United States Senator from South Carolina
 Steven Hayne, a forensic pathologist from Mississippi

See also
 Hayne van Ghizeghem, Flemish Renaissance musician
 Hain (disambiguation)
 Haine (disambiguation)
 Haynes (disambiguation)

References